We Americans is a 1928 American silent drama film directed by Edward Sloman and starring George Sidney, Patsy Ruth Miller and George J. Lewis.

Synopsis
Two young couples try to cross the mixed ethnic divide in America, something which is only resolved when World War I reveals the truth of American society's melting pot.

Cast
 George Sidney as Mr. Levine
 Patsy Ruth Miller as Beth Levine
 George J. Lewis as Phil Levine
 Eddie Phillips as Pete Albertini
 Beryl Mercer as Mrs. Levine
 John Boles as Hugh Bradleigh
 Albert Gran as Mr. Schmidt
 Michael Visaroff as Mr. Albertini
 Kathlyn Williams as Mrs. Bradleigh
 Edward Martindel as Mr. Bradleigh
 Josephine Dunn as Helen Bradleigh
 Daisy Belmore as Mrs. Schmidt
 Rosita Marstini as 	Mrs. Albertini
 Andy Devine as Pat O'Dougal
 Flora Bramley as Sara Schmidt
 John Bleifer as 	Korn

References

Bibliography
 Erens, Patricia.The Jew in American Cinema. Indiana University Press, 1984.
 Munden, Kenneth White. The American Film Institute Catalog of Motion Pictures Produced in the United States, Part 1. University of California Press, 1997.

External links
 

1928 films
1928 drama films
1920s English-language films
American silent feature films
Silent American drama films
Films directed by Edward Sloman
American black-and-white films
Universal Pictures films
1920s American films